Vladimir Imamovich Norov (born 31 August 1955, in Bukhara) is the former Minister of Foreign Affairs of Uzbekistan (2006–2010 and 27 April–30 December 2022) and a former Secretary-General of the Shanghai Cooperation Organisation (2019–2021).

Early years
Norov, was born on August 31, 1955 in the city of Bukhara, in southern Uzbekistan. From 1972-1976, he studied at and graduated from the Mathematics Department of the Bukhara Pedagogical Institute. He then served in the Soviet Army from 1976 till 1977. From 1978-1983, Norov worked in the Ministry of Internal Affairs in Uzbek SSR and from 1983-1985, he studied at and graduated from the Internal Affairs Ministry Academy in Moscow. Then, he continued working for the MIA and in 1988-1990 was a student of the adjunct courses at the Interior Ministry Academy followed by two more years of employment at the MIA.

Political career
From 1993 through 1995, Norov was the Consultant on administrative and legal issues of the Office of the President of the Republic of Uzbekistan. In 1995-1996, he served as the First Deputy of the Minister of Foreign Affairs of Uzbekistan and in 1996-1998 was the State Advisor to the President on intergovernmental relations and foreign economic relations. In 1998, he was appointed the Ambassador of Uzbekistan to Germany which he held until 2003. From 2002, he also assumed ambassador's duties to Switzerland and Poland while in Berlin. From 2003 until 2005, he was the First Deputy Minister of Foreign Affairs. On December 29, 2004, he was appointed Ambassador to Belgium and returned to Uzbekistan in mid-2006. He was appointed Minister of Foreign Affairs of Uzbekistan on July 12, 2006. He also served as ambassador to the Netherlands and Luxembourg.

Norov has the rank of Ambassador Extraordinary and Plenipotentiary. He was awarded Uzbek national award Mekhnat Shukhrati.

He speaks English, Russian and German, and is married with three children.

Other positions
On December 30, 2022, Shavkat Mirziyoyev signed an order appointing Vladimir Norov to the post of Director of the International Institute of Central Asia (MICA).

Awards and honors
 Badge of the Ministry of Foreign Affairs of Russia "For Contribution to International Cooperation" (2022, Russia)
 Order "Galkynyş" (2022, Turkmenistan)
 Order "Mehnat shuhrati" (2003, Uzbekistan)

References

External links
Statement of Vladimir Norov at the 61st session of United Nations

1955 births
Living people
Ambassadors of Uzbekistan to Belgium
Ambassadors of Uzbekistan to Germany
Ambassadors of Uzbekistan to Switzerland
Ambassadors of Uzbekistan to Poland
Foreign Ministers of Uzbekistan
People from Bukhara
Ambassadors of Uzbekistan to Luxembourg
Ambassadors of Uzbekistan to the Netherlands